Mochammad Zaenuri (born 10 June 1995), is an Indonesian professional footballer who plays as a centre-back for Liga 1 club Dewa United.

Club career

Perseru Serui
In 2017, Zaenuri signed a year contract with Perseru Serui. He made his league debut on 20 April 2017 in a match against Bhayangkara. On 18 October 2017, Zaenuri scored his first goal for Perseru against Persegres Gresik United in the 45th minute at the Petrokimia Stadium, Gresik.

Arema
After being released by Perseru Serui, Arema immediately signed Zaenuri on a free transfer during the 2018 mid-season transfer window. He made his league debut on 24 March 2017 in a match against Mitra Kukar at the Kanjuruhan Stadium, Malang.

Persela Lamongan
He was signed for Persela Lamongan to play in Liga 1 in the 2018 season. Zaenuri made his debut on 16 September 2018 in a match against Bhayangkara. On 26 June 2019, Zaenuri scored his first goal for Persela against Bhayangkara in the 3rd minute at the Patriot Stadium, Bekasi.

Persebaya Surabaya
Zaenuri was signed for Persebaya Surabaya to play in Liga 1 in the 2022–23 season.

Dewa United
Zaenuri was signed for Dewa United to play in Liga 1 in the 2022–23 season. He made his league debut on 7 August 2022 in a match against Persita Tangerang at the Indomilk Arena, Tangerang.

International career
In 2014, Zaenuri represented the Indonesia U-23, in the 2014 Asian Games.

Career statistics

Club

References

External links
 Mochammad Zaenuri at Soccerway
 Mochammad Zaenuri at Liga Indonesia

1996 births
Living people
Indonesian footballers
Association football defenders
Liga 1 (Indonesia) players
Persibo Bojonegoro players
Bhayangkara F.C. players
Persepam Madura Utama players
Perseru Serui players
Arema F.C. players
Persela Lamongan players
Persebaya Surabaya players
Dewa United F.C. players
Indonesia youth international footballers
Footballers at the 2014 Asian Games
Asian Games competitors for Indonesia
People from Bojonegoro Regency
Sportspeople from East Java